Crescent Beach may refer to several places:

Canada 
 Crescent Beach, Nova Scotia
 Crescent Beach, Lockeport, Nova Scotia
 Crescent Beach, Lunenburg County, Nova Scotia
 Crescent Beach, British Columbia

United States 
 Crescent Beach, Brevard County, Florida
 Crescent Beach, St. Johns County, Florida
 Crescent Beach, Sarasota County, Florida
 Crescent Beach, South Carolina